The Water Gipsies is a romantic comedy novel by British writer A. P. Herbert first published in 1930. It portrays the adventures of Jane Bell and her sister Lily, who operate a barge along England's rivers and canals. Jane enjoys several romantic entanglements during the story.

The novel is Herbert's best-known work, and reflected his lifelong love of British waterways. He lived in Hammersmith Terrace, and a thinly disguised version of The Dove pub appears as The Pigeons.

Adaptations

Film

In 1932 the novel was made into a film directed by Maurice Elvey and starring Ann Todd as Jane Bell. It was the last film made by Associated Talking Pictures at Beaconsfield Studios before relocating to Ealing.

Musical
In 1955 Herbert collaborated with Vivian Ellis to produce a stage musical of the film. The cast included Dora Bryan, Doris Hare and Jerry Verno. It was a success, running for 239 performances.

References

1930 British novels
British romance novels
Novels set in England
Novels set in London
Novels by A. P. Herbert
British novels adapted into films
Methuen Publishing books